Klub Kolarski Lechia Gdańsk is a Polish cycling club based in Gdańsk, Poland. For the most part of its history the club was not successful and has been seen as more of a cycling club for the residents of Gdańsk to join. The team however did have some success in its early days, with the tour wins at the Tour de Pologne in 1957 and 1961 being the most notable in the team's history. Henryk Kowalski, the rider for Lechia was the winning rider on both occasions. In the club's recent years the only notable success since the turn of the century has been at the Polish Mountain Biking Championships where Michał Bogdziewicz won the marathon classification and finished runner-up in the elite classification.

Honours

Road racing
Tour de Pologne
 Overall 1957 Tour de Pologne, Henryk Kowalski
 Overall 1961 Tour de Pologne, Henryk Kowalski
1959 – Stage 1, Henryk Kowalski

Mountain bike racing
Polish Mountain Biking Championship
Marathon classification
Winner – 2003, Michał Bogdziewicz
Elite classification
Runner-up – 2003, Michał Bogdziewicz

References 

Sport in Gdańsk
Lechia Gdańsk
Cycling teams based in Poland